Sheheen is a surname. Notable people with the surname include:

Ralph Sheheen (born 1964), American broadcaster
Robert Sheheen (born 1943), American lawyer and politician
Vincent Sheheen (born 1971), American attorney and politician, nephew of Robert

See also
Shehee